The Dar Essid Museum is an art museum located in a palace in the medina of Sousse, Tunisia. The edifice belonged to a family of aristocrats.

The museum retraces the daily city life in Sousse in the 18th and 19th centuries.

See also

Dar Jellouli Museum
Nabeul Museum

References 

Museums in Tunisia